Sung-sook, also spelled Song-suk, is a Korean feminine given name.  Its meaning depends on the hanja used to write each syllable of the name. There are 27 hanja with the reading "sung" and 13 hanja with the reading "sook" on the South Korean government's official list of hanja which may be registered for use in given names.

People with this name include:
Jung Sung-sook (born 1972), South Korean judo practitioner
O Song-suk (born 1977), North Korean long-distance runner

See also
List of Korean given names

References

Korean feminine given names